Pasqualino Abeti (born 2 April 1948) is an Italian former sprinter who competed in the 1972 Summer Olympics. He was part of the Italian 4 × 100 m relay team that won the gold medal at the 1971 Mediterranean Games.

Biography
In the "Pietro Mennea era", Pasqualino Abeti won three national titles in the 100 and 200 m events, in 1969 and 1975.

National titles
He won 7 national championships.
 Italian Athletics Championships
 100 metres: 1969, 1975
 200 metres:  1969, 1975
 Italian Athletics Indoor Championships
 60 metres: 1970
 200 metres: 1980
 400 metres: 1973

References

External links
 

1948 births
Living people
Italian male sprinters
Olympic athletes of Italy
Athletes (track and field) at the 1972 Summer Olympics
European Athletics Championships medalists
Mediterranean Games gold medalists for Italy
Mediterranean Games medalists in athletics
Athletes (track and field) at the 1971 Mediterranean Games
Italian Athletics Championships winners
20th-century Italian people